Merica marisca is a species of sea snail, a marine gastropod mollusk in the family Cancellariidae, the nutmeg snails.

Description
The length of the shell attains 25.4 mm.

Distribution
This marine species occurs off New Caledonia

References

Cancellariidae
Gastropods described in 2002